Paraswammerdamia ruthiella is a moth of the family Yponomeutidae. It is found in Germany.

References

Moths described in 1993
Yponomeutidae
Endemic fauna of Germany
Moths of Europe